The 2007 NCAA Division I men's ice hockey tournament involved 16 schools playing in single-elimination play to determine the national champion of men's NCAA Division I college ice hockey as the culmination of the 2006–07 season. The tournament began on March 23, 2007, and ended with the championship game on April 7.

Tournament procedure

The NCAA Men's Division I Ice Hockey Championship is a single-elimination tournament featuring 16 teams representing all six Division I conferences in the nation.  The Championship Committee seeds the entire field from 1 to 16 within four regionals of 4 teams.  The winners of the six Division I conference championships receive automatic bids to participate in the NCAA Championship.

The four regionals are officially named after their geographic areas.  The following were the sites for the 2007 regionals:
March 23 and 24
East Regional, Blue Cross Arena – Rochester, New York (Host: ECAC Hockey League)
Midwest Regional, Van Andel Arena – Grand Rapids, Michigan (Host: Western Michigan University)

March 24 and 25
West Regional, Pepsi Center – Denver, Colorado (Host: University of Denver)
Northeast Regional, Verizon Wireless Arena – Manchester, New Hampshire (Host: University of New Hampshire)

Each regional winner advanced to the Frozen Four:
April 5 and 7
Scottrade Center – St. Louis, Missouri (Hosts: College Hockey America and the St. Louis Sports Commission)

Qualifying teams
Hockey East had five teams receive a berth in the tournament, the Central Collegiate Hockey Association (CCHA) had four teams receive a berth, the Western Collegiate Hockey Association (WCHA) had three teams receive a berth, the ECACHL had two teams receive a berth, and Atlantic Hockey and College Hockey America (CHA) each had one team receive a berth.

Brackets

The number in parentheses denotes overall seed in the tournament.

West Regional – Denver, Colorado

Midwest Regional – Grand Rapids, Michigan

Note: * denotes overtime period(s)

East Regional – Rochester, New York

Northeast Regional – Manchester, New Hampshire

Frozen Four – St. Louis, Missouri

Regional semifinals

West Regional

Midwest Regional

East Regional

Northeast Regional

Regional Finals

West Regional

Midwest Regional

East Regional

Northeast Regional

Frozen Four

National semifinals

National championship

Record by conference

All-Tournament team

Frozen Four
G: Jeff Lerg (Michigan State)
D: Tyler Howells (Michigan State)
D: Brian Boyle (Boston College)
F: Justin Abdelkader* (Michigan State)
F: Nathan Gerbe (Boston College)
F: Tim Kennedy (Michigan State)
* Most Outstanding Player(s)

References

Tournament
NCAA Division I men's ice hockey tournament
NCAA Division I men's ice hockey tournament
NCAA Division I men's ice hockey tournament
NCAA Division I men's ice hockey tournament
NCAA Division I men's ice hockey tournament
NCAA Division I men's ice hockey tournament
NCAA Division I men's ice hockey tournament
NCAA Division I men's ice hockey tournament
2000s in Denver
2000s in St. Louis
21st century in Rochester, New York
History of Grand Rapids, Michigan
Ice hockey competitions in St. Louis
Ice hockey in Rochester, New York
Ice hockey competitions in Denver
Ice hockey competitions in Michigan
Ice hockey competitions in New Hampshire
Ice hockey competitions in New York (state)
Sports in Grand Rapids, Michigan
Sports in Manchester, New Hampshire